Sava Petrov (born 18 June 1998) is a Serbian footballer who plays as a forward for Radnički Niš.

Club career

Partizan
Born in Belgrade, Petrov came through Partizan's youth system, where he was mentored by Darko Tešović. He joined the first team in 2016, making a debut in a friendly against Beroe Stara Zagora in May same year. In August 2016, Petrov signed his first professional contract with the club on five-year deal. Shortly after, he was loaned to the satellite club Teleoptik at one-year spell. Collecting 20 matches with 4 goals for the season, Petrov contributed in winning the Serbian League Belgrade for the 2016–17 campaign. In the meantime, Petrov had been connected with Borussia Dortmund in the mid-season, but failed to sign a contract with the German club. He also stayed with Partizan, training with the first team and playing with reserves respectively, making several matches in unofficial competition named Serbian B League. Although he did not make any appearances during the season, Petrov had been awarded for winning the 2016–17 Serbian SuperLiga campaign. He lost his medal during the celebration, which was given back to him from a fan who had found it on the field. In summer 2017, Petrov passed the pre-season with Partizan, after which he moved back to training with Teleoptik before the 2017–18 Serbian First League campaign. Failing to make any official appearance with Partizan as a senior, Petrov mutually terminated a contract and left the club as a free agent in August 2017.

Spartak Subotica
At the beginning of September 2017, Petrov joined Spartak Subotica as a single player, penning a three-year contract with the club. Through the regular season, Petrov was usually used as a back-up player under coach Aleksandar Veselinović. Next he left the club, Petrov spent several successive matches on the bench in the play-off season under Vladimir Gaćinović. Petrov made his professional debut in 3–0 away defeat against Čukarički on 29 April 2018, replacing Bojan Čečarić in 37 minte of the match. At the beginning of the summer pre-season, Petrov missed the first training on 10 June 2018.

Westerlo
On 18 June 2018, Petrov joined the Belgian First Division B side Westerlo on a three-year deal. On 26 August 2020, he was loaned out to Lierse Kempenzonen for the 2020–21 season.

Olimpija Ljubljana
On 2 July 2021, Petrov signed a two-year contract with Slovenian PrvaLiga side Olimpija Ljubljana.

International career
Petrov was invited to the Serbia under-17 national team in 2015. He made his debut for the team in a friendly match against Slovenia on 26 February of the same year. As a coach of Serbia national under-18 football team, Ivan Tomić called Petrov into the squad in summer 2015. Petrov played with the team as a regular member until 2016, scoring a goal in a match against Hungary on 21 April 2016. In September 2016, Petrov made his debut for Serbian under-19 level, scoring in the opening match of the memorial tournament "Stevan Vilotić - Ćele", against the United States. While with the team, he also scored in a 4–1 victory over Bulgaria on 23 February 2017.

Style of play
Standing at 1.87 m, Petrov is a right-footed footballer, who mainly operates as an attacker. Petrov is capable of playing as a winger or centre forward in different occasions and tactical settings. Petrov is described as a versatile player with a good vision of the game who likes to dribble and going face to face with the opponent, and is recognized for his speed and finishing.

Career statistics

Honours
Partizan
Serbian SuperLiga: 2016–17
Teleoptik
Serbian League Belgrade: 2016–17

References

External links
 
 
 

1998 births
Living people
Footballers from Belgrade
Association football forwards
Serbian footballers
Serbian expatriate footballers
Serbia youth international footballers
FK Partizan players
FK Teleoptik players
FK Spartak Subotica players
K.V.C. Westerlo players
Lierse Kempenzonen players
NK Olimpija Ljubljana (2005) players
FK Mladost Lučani players
FK Radnički Niš players
Serbian League players
Serbian SuperLiga players
Challenger Pro League players
Slovenian PrvaLiga players
Serbian expatriate sportspeople in Belgium
Expatriate footballers in Belgium
Serbian expatriate sportspeople in Slovenia
Expatriate footballers in Slovenia